Petticoat Creek is a stream in the cities of Pickering, Toronto and Markham in the Greater Toronto Area of Ontario, Canada. The creek is in the Great Lakes Basin, is a tributary of Lake Ontario, and falls under the auspices of the Toronto and Region Conservation Authority. Land use in the watershed consists of 52% agricultural, 27% protected greenspace and 21% urban.

The "Petticoat Creek watershed is dominated by the South Slope physiographic region, a smooth, faintly drumlinized till plain."

Because the creek is not long enough for its headwaters to lie within the groundwater rich Oak Ridges Moraine, waterflow on the upper reaches is intermittent and dependent on precipitation.
Lower reaches, below the ancient shoreline of glacial Lake Iroquois, is more consistent.

Petticoat Creek Conservation Area
The Petticoat Creek Conservation Area is located at the mouth of the creek at Lake Ontario, and is managed by the Toronto and Region Conservation Authority after the Petticoat Creek Conservation Authority was absorbed in the TRCA.

See also
 Waterfront Trail

References

Footnotes

Bibliography

External links
 Petticoat Creek Conservation Area
 Petticoat Creek Watershed Report Card 2018 (Toronto and Region Conservation Authority)
 Upper Petticoat Creek Terrestrial Biological Inventory and Assessment 2015 (Toronto and Region Conservation Authority)

Rivers of the Regional Municipality of York
Rivers of the Regional Municipality of Durham
Rivers of Toronto
Tributaries of Lake Ontario